The 2018–19 Northern Counties East Football League season was the 37th in the history of Northern Counties East Football League, a football competition in England.

Premier Division

The Premier Division featured 16 clubs which competed in the previous season, along with four new clubs.
Clubs promoted from Division One:
Eccleshill United
Knaresborough Town
Yorkshire Amateur
Plus:
Goole, relegated from the Northern Premier League

League table

Stadia and locations

Division One

Division One featured 17 clubs which competed in the previous season, along with three new clubs:
 Harworth Colliery, promoted from the Central Midlands League
 Parkgate, relegated from the Premier Division
 Skegness Town, promoted from the Lincolnshire League

League table

Stadia & locations

League Cup

The 2018–19 Northern Counties East Football League League Cup was the 37th season of the league cup competition of the Northern Counties East Football League.

First round

Second round

Third round

References

External links
 Northern Counties East Football League

2018–19
9